It's Me Again is the second studio album by American singer Tweet. It was released on March 21, 2005, by The Goldmind Inc. and Atlantic Records. The album debuted at number 17 on the US Billboard 200 with first-week sales of 55,000 copies.

Singles
Proposals for the album's lead single dates back to early 2004, where MTV reported that the Missy Elliott-produced "Shook Up", featuring former 106 & Park co-host Free, was in consideration for a lead single choice. However, complications from the merging between Elektra Records and Atlantic prevented the song's release, resulting in the song's cancellation and a pushback date for Tweet's It's Me Again album. On October 5, 2004, "Turn da Lights Off" was released and began to appear on numerous mixtapes to help spread the word of the song's release. A promotional remix featuring 50 Cent and an alternate line by Missy Elliott was also released to mixtapes in order to generate further buzz for the single.

Commercially, the single was unsuccessful in the United States, where it reached number eight on the US Bubbling Under Hot 100 Singles chart and number 39 on the Hot R&B/Hip-Hop Songs chart. However, the song fared well on the UK Singles Chart, peaking at number 29.

Commercial performance
It's Me Again debuted at number 17 on the US Billboard 200, selling 55,000 copies in its first week.

Track listing

Notes
  signifies a co-producer.
  signifies an executive producer.
 Track 15 contains the hidden track "When I Need a Man" from the USA Network original series Kojak, starring Ving Rhames.

Sample credits
 "Turn da Lights Off" contains a sample of "Lost April" by Nat King Cole and portions of "If This World Were Mine" by Marvin Gaye and Tammi Terrell.
 "You" contains portions of "Stardust" by Louis Armstrong.
 "Cab Ride" contains material from the Taxi theme song "Angela" by Bob James.
 "Sports, Sex & Food" contains a sample of "Hey Pocky A-Way" by The Meters.
 "I'm Done" contains a sample of "Intimate Friends" by Eddie Kendricks.
 "We Don't Need No Water" contains an interpolation of "The Roof Is on Fire" by Rock Master Scott & the Dynamic Three and a sample of "Mango Meat" by Mandrill.

Personnel
Credits adapted from the liner notes of It's Me Again.

Musicians

 Tweet – vocals
 Missy Elliott – vocals 
 Cesare Turner – horn 
 Rell – vocals 
 John "Jubu" Smith – bass ; guitar 
 Soul Diggaz – drum programming ; additional percussion 
 Charlie Bereal – guitar 
 Tashawna – vocals 
 Craig Brockman – keyboards 
 Marty Cintron III – acoustic guitar 
 Nisan Stewart – drums 
 Josh Freese – drums 
 LamTrak Productions – additional drum programming 
 Michael Parnell – bass 
 Steve Plunkett – arrangement, guitar 
 Spencer Proffer – arrangement, keyboards

Technical

 Craig Brockman – production ; co-production 
 Dylan "3D" Dresdow – recording, mixing 
 Missy Elliott – production ; executive production
 Kwamé – production ; co-production 
 Mike Rivera – recording 
 Jimmy Douglass – mixing 
 Carlos Bedoya – additional recording ; mixing ; recording 
 Dave Heuer – additional recording 
 Patrick Magee – mixing assistance 
 Marcella Araica – tracking engineering assistance ; mixing assistance 
 Tweet – production ; co-executive production
 Nisan Stewart – co-production ; production 
 Charlie Bereal – co-production ; production 
 Stan Malveaux – recording 
 Walter Millsap III – production, recording, mixing 
 Soul Diggaz – production 
 Israel "PT" Najera – recording 
 Madball Entertainment – co-production 
 Kenneth Bereal – production 
 Marty Cintron III – production 
 Javier Valverde – mixing assistance 
 Timbaland – production 
 Spencer Proffer – production 
 Steve Plunkett – production 
 Mona Scott – executive production 
 Tom Weir – recording 
 Paul Falcone – mixing 
 Herb Powers Jr. – mastering

Artwork
 Anita Marisa Boriboon – art direction, design
 Antti J. – cover photography
 Mark Liddell – photography
 Arnold Turner – additional package photos
 Andrew Zach – Atlantic art production

Charts

Release history

Notes

References

2005 albums
Albums produced by Craig Brockman
Albums produced by Missy Elliott
Albums produced by Timbaland
Atlantic Records albums
Tweet (singer) albums